Rudi Gusnić (born 5 August 1971) is a Macedonian-Serbian football manager and former player.

Club career
Born in Gostivar, SR Macedonia, SFR Yugoslavia, he started his career at FK Sloga Kraljevo where he played in all youth levels. As a senior, he debuted playing with FK Kolubara from where he moved in 1995 to Belgrade to play with FK Čukarički where he spent most of his career becoming one of the most charismatic players of the club. In 2002, he had a six-month spell with Polish side Legia Warszawa from where he returned to Čukarički where he played till near the end of his career. He finished his playing career playing with FK Ribnica Mionica during the second half of he 2003–04 season.

Managerial career
After retiring, he stayed at Čukarički, becoming the assistant manager of several club coaches, and, afterwards, since 2007, working as the main youth coach.

References

External sources
  Rudi Gusnić at playerhistory.com
 
 Profile at Srbijafudbal

1971 births
Living people
People from Gostivar
Serbs of North Macedonia
Association football midfielders
Macedonian footballers
Serbian footballers
FK Kolubara players
FK Sloga Kraljevo players
FK Čukarički players
Legia Warsaw players
Yugoslav Second League players
First League of Serbia and Montenegro players
Ekstraklasa players
Macedonian expatriate footballers
Expatriate footballers in Poland
Macedonian expatriate sportspeople in Poland
Serbian expatriate sportspeople in Poland
Macedonian football managers
Serbian football managers